Builders of Castles is a 1917 silent film drama directed by Ben Turbett. It starred Marc McDermott and Miriam Nesbitt, a real-life husband and wife team. It was produced by the Edison Manufacturing Company.

Cast
Marc McDermott - Gittens
Miriam Nesbitt - Marie
William Wadsworth - Morton
Robert Brower - The Builder
Edward G. Longman - Reverend James Filikens
Jessie Stevens - Mrs. Maguire
Florence Stover - Fannie
Nellie Grant - Mrs. Morton
Simon P. Gillies - James Regan
Frank Trainor - Postman
Mabel Dwight - Marie's Landlady

Preservation status
This film is preserved in the George Eastman House collection.

References

External links
Builders of Castles at IMDb.com

1917 films
American silent feature films
Silent American drama films
Edison Manufacturing Company films
American black-and-white films
1917 drama films
1910s American films